The Ccatca District is one of the twelve districts in the Quispicanchi Province in Peru. Its capital is the town of Ccatca.

Geography 
Other mountains are listed below:

Ethnic groups 
The people in the district are mainly indigenous citizens of Quechua descent. Quechua is the language which the majority of the population (94.64%) learnt to speak in childhood, 5.00% of the residents started speaking using the Spanish language (2007 Peru Census).

See also 
 Pachamama Raymi

References  

  Instituto Nacional de Estadística e Informática. Departamento Cusco. Retrieved on November 1, 2007.